Gorowa is a Cushitic language spoken in Tanzania in the Dodoma and Manyara Regions.

It is also known as Fiome, Goroa, Gorwaa, Kimbulu, Ufiomi.

As of 2014, an estimated 79,000 people (approx. 60% of the ethnic population) use this language on a daily basis. Older Gorwaa speakers in rural areas tend to be enthusiastic about their language and have contributed to a large body of data including songs, traditional stories, uncommon vocabulary, etc. Younger Gorwaa in urban areas view the language as less useful and may be reticent to speak it. Some use the exonym Mbulu (from a large Iraqw settlement) and say they speak Kimbulu; however, this is still the Gorwaa language. Codeswitching with Swahili is ubiquitous. Young speakers involved in documentation of Gorwaa have become researchers and assumed ownership of the project. 

Instances of Gorwaa writing are rare, and show a great variety of non-standard spellings. It is common to use the orthography of Iraqw for Gorwaa written communication.

See also 

 Gorowa people

Notes

External links 
 Link to ELAR documentation of Gorwaa
 Brief introduction to Gorwaa  by Andew T. Harvey
 An archive of language and cultural material from the Gorwaa people of Babati
 Gorwaa DoReCo corpus compiled by Andrew Harvey. Audio recordings of narrative texts with transcriptions time-aligned at the phone level, translations, and time-aligned morphological annotations.

South Cushitic languages
Languages of Tanzania